Miguel Ángel Yunes Linares (born December 5, 1952) is a Mexican politician and former Governor of Veracruz from 2016 to 2018.

Biography

Early political career in the PRI
Yunes graduated from the Universidad Veracruzana with a law degree in 1974; during his studies, he worked as a legal advisor in his hometown of Soledad de Doblado. He worked in the civil service from 1974 to 1975 and then as the president of the state's Fiscal Tribunal between 1977 and 1978.

In 1969, Yunes joined the Institutional Revolutionary Party. In 1980, he was elected as a deputy for the first time, to the LI Legislature of the Congress of Veracruz. Yunes's political career developed simultaneously in the PRI and the civil service. He was an official in the Chamber of Deputies between 1982 and 1985, and he served as a national coordinator of state federations within the PRI's Confederación Nacional de Organizaciones Populares. Between 1985 and 1987, Yunes was the director deputy general of the SCT's Department of Airports and Auxiliary Services (ASA).

In 1988, the PRI ran Yunes as a candidate for federal deputy; while he did not win, he instead worked in the Secretariat of Urban Development and Ecology (SEDUE), and he also picked up a diploma in political analysis from the Universidad Iberoamericana in 1990. At the 1991 midterm elections, Yunes was elected to the LV Legislature of the Mexican Congress as a federal deputy, the first of three terms he would serve in San Lázaro. From 1992 to 1997, overlapping with his time as a federal deputy, he coordinated the State Public Security Council.

In 1997, Yunes became the president of the PRI in Veracruz and served as the national coordinator for legal matters between 2002 and 2003.

From 1999 to 2000, Yunes served as the director general of Prevention and Social Readaptation within the Secretariat of the Interior; he would take up a similar post in 2005 with the Secretariat of Public Security.

Party switch and first run for governor
In 2003, the PRI returned Yunes to the Chamber of Deputies for the LIX Legislature of the Mexican Congress. He was elected from the third electoral region representing the state of Campeche. He presided over the Constitutional Points Commission and sat on two others: Jurisdictional, and Justice and Human Rights.

His second term in San Lázaro was also noteworthy for his resignation from the party. When he left the Chamber in 2005, he was officially an independent, though he had been dropped from all of his commissions; he was replaced by his alternate, another Veracruz native representing Campeche, Aníbal Peralta Galicia.

From 2006 to 2010, Yunes Linares presided over the Institute for Social Security and Services for State Workers (ISSSTE). During this time, in 2008, he formally affiliated with the National Action Party.

In 2010, Yunes resigned from the ISSSTE and made his first run for governor, backed by a coalition of the PAN and Nueva Alianza. In one of the closest gubernatorial elections of the year, Yunes came in second, losing out to Javier Duarte by three percentage points.

Yunes Linares returned to the Chamber of Deputies in 2015, for the LXIII Legislature when the PAN placed him on their list from the third electoral region. He presided over the Public Security Commission and served on those dealing with Human Rights and Constitutional Points.

Success in 2016
In 2016, Yunes ran again for governor, this time under the joint banner of the PAN and PRD. He obtained 33.9 percent of the vote, edging out PRI candidate Héctor Yunes Landa, his cousin, and becoming the first non-PRI candidate to win the governorship of Veracruz in 86 years.

As a result of Veracruz and other states aligning their gubernatorial elections to the presidential calendar, Yunes Linares served a two-year term, and the office went up for election in 2018. Yunes Landa has lamented his familial relationship with Yunes Linares, claiming that he "insulted" the family.

On June 4, 2019, former governor Yunes Linares was accused of embezzling MXN$36 billion (US$1.8 billion), which he claimed was "petty cash".

Personal life
Yunes Linares's family includes other noteworthy politicians, including Yunes Landa, as well as his sons: Fernando Yunes Márquez, mayor of Veracruz and Miguel Ángel Yunes Márquez, former mayor of Boca del Río and 2018 candidate for Governor of Veracruz.

References

Institutional Revolutionary Party politicians
20th-century Mexican judges
Politicians from Veracruz
1952 births
Living people
National Action Party (Mexico) politicians
21st-century Mexican politicians
Governors of Veracruz
Universidad Veracruzana alumni